Vigors is a surname, and may refer to:

Bartholomew Vigors (1644–1721), Anglican priest in Ireland 
Nicholas Aylward Vigors (1785–1840), Irish zoologist and politician
Tim Vigors (1922–2003), British fighter ace, founder of the Coolmore Stud

See also
Vigor (name)